Rich Blomquist (born July 27, 1977) is an American writer, producer and occasional actor. He was a staff writer for The Daily Show in 2003–2006, 2009 and 2011.

Career
He has also contributed material to Saturday Night Live, specifically for Robert Smigel's TV Funhouse. Blomquist is originally from Westbrook, Connecticut. He graduated in 2000 from the School of Communications at Elon University in North Carolina.

Blomquist and his wife Kristen Schaal wrote a book together called The Sexy Book of Sexy Sex. It was published in July 2010 by Chronicle Books.

Blomquist wrote for The Last Man on Earth until it got cancelled and is currently writing for the animated sitcom Bless the Harts, both for Fox Broadcasting Company and 20th Century Fox Television. He also voices the character of Daniel Culp.

Personal life
Blomquist lives in New York City and is married to actress and voice actress Kristen Schaal. They have a daughter, Ruby, born February 11, 2018. He is of Swedish descent.

Books
 2010 – Earth (The Book)
 2010 – The Sexy Book of Sexy Sex – co-written with wife Kristen Schaal

References

External links
 
 Elon University, Blomquist

Living people
American people of Swedish descent
Elon University alumni
American comedy writers
American television writers
American male television writers
Writers Guild of America Award winners
Primetime Emmy Award winners
Writers from New York City
People from Westbrook, Connecticut
Screenwriters from New York (state)
1977 births
Screenwriters from Connecticut